Dwarahat is a town, near Almora town and a nagar panchayat in Almora district in the state of Uttarakhand, India.

Geography
It has an average elevation of 1,510 metres (4954.068 feet).

Demographics
Dwarahat is a Nagar Panchayat city in district of Almora, Uttarakhand. The Dwarahat city is divided into 4 wards for which elections are held every 5 years. The Dwarahat Nagar Panchayat has population of 2,749 of which 1,378 are males while 1,371 are females as per report released by Census India 2011.

Population of Children with age of 0-6 is 310 which is 11.28 % of total population of Dwarahat (NP). In Dwarahat Nagar Panchayat, Female Sex Ratio is of 995 against state average of 963. Moreover Child Sex Ratio in Dwarahat is around 813 compared to Uttarakhand state average of 890. Literacy rate of Dwarahat city is 92.82 % higher than state average of 78.82 %. In Dwarahat, Male literacy is around 96.93 % while female literacy rate is 88.80 %.

Dwarahat Nagar Panchayat has total administration over 668 houses to which it supplies basic amenities like water and sewerage. It is also authorize to build roads within Nagar Panchayat limits and impose taxes on properties coming under its jurisdiction.

Education
A Government Engineering College Bipin Tripathi Kumaon Institute of Technology was established in 1991 in Dwarahat.

A Polytechnic College, PG College, Dwarahat Inter College Dwarahat, Govt. Inter college, Government Girls Inter College, M.D. Tiwari High School Dwarahat, Dunagiri Modern School, Dr Leeladhar Bhatt Vivekanand Vidya Mandir Inter College Dwarahat, Kumaon Public School Dwarahat, Universal Convent School Dwarahat and Saraswati Shishu Mandir Dwarahat are situated here.

Culture
Dwarahat is also known as Sanskritik Nagari (Cultural heritage) where many temples were constructed by Katyuri Kings in 7th to 11th Century (Which has as many as 55 ancient temples). Dwarahat is also known for the branch ashram of Yogoda Satsanga Society of India, known as Yogoda Satsanga Sakha Ashram, Dwarahat. It carries on many charitable activities including eye camps and a school, plus teaches Kriya Yoga.

There are hundreads of big & small temples in Dwarahat. Dunagiri Temple is the most famous among them. There is also a Kedarnath and a Badrinath temple there, which was constructed by Katyuri kings. Ratandev, Maha Mrityunjay, Gurjardev and other temples were also constructed by the Katyuris.

References

External links
 
 Dwarahat, Official website
The Paperhut Project - An interesting article on Dwarahat originally published in Outlook India
 Dunagiri For information about Dunagiri and other surrounding areas of Dwarahat

Cities and towns in Almora district